Euryphurana nobilis, the noble commander, is a butterfly in the family Nymphalidae. It is found in Sierra Leone, Liberia, Ivory Coast, Nigeria, Cameroon, the Republic of the Congo, the Central African Republic, the Democratic Republic of the Congo and Zambia. The habitat consists of wetter forests.

Adults have been recorded attending arboreal nests of Crematogaster ants.

Subspecies
Euryphurana nobilis nobilis (Sierra Leone, Liberia, eastern Ivory Coast, Nigeria, Congo, Central African Republic)
Euryphurana nobilis viridis (Hancock, 1990) (Zambia, Democratic Republic of the Congo: Shaba)

References

Seitz, A. Die Gross-Schmetterlinge der Erde 13: Die Afrikanischen Tagfalter. Plate XIII 36 e

Limenitidinae
Monotypic butterfly genera
Nymphalidae genera